The Bunker is a full motion video (FMV) adventure horror video game developed by British game developer Splendy Games and published by Wales Interactive. It was released on Microsoft Windows, OS X, PlayStation 4 on 20 September 2016 followed by Xbox One on 23 September 2016 and Nintendo Switch on 9 April 2018.

The Bunker is Splendy Games' first major title as an independent games studio after having released the FMV zombie horror video game The Hunting on iOS and Android devices. The Bunker features the writers and designer of adventure video games, including The Witcher, Broken Sword and SOMA.

Gameplay
The game's player follows the daily routine of the main protagonist, John (played by Adam Brown), who grew up in a fallout shelter in Britain following a nuclear war. When an alarm is triggered, the player has to guide John around the bunker to venture into forgotten areas, recovering his repressed memories and unlocking the secrets of the bunker. The player is presented with live action footage throughout the entire game, with a point and click style of adventure gameplay. Utilising a third and first person camera, the player is presented with both flashback sequences and present day footage of an underground nuclear bunker.

Development
After releasing The Hunting, Splendy Games set out to create a more ambitious live action game with an increased budget and significantly higher production values. The Bunker was filmed entirely at the Kelvedon Hatch Secret Nuclear Bunker in Essex, England over 15 days, with the entire game development spreading over a year. For the main characters, Splendy Games hired a cast of actors including Adam Brown who had played Ori in The Hobbit film series, and Sarah Greene who played Hecate Poole in the Penny Dreadful TV series and who also voiced Anne Bonny in Assassin's Creed IV: Black Flag. The game also stars Grahame Fox who had portrayed Ralf Kenning in the Game of Thrones and Jerome St. John Blake who played various characters in Star Wars.

Reception

Critical reception
The Bunker received mixed reviews following the launch. Review aggregator Metacritic shows an average score of 68 out of 100 for the PlayStation 4 version, and 66 out of 100 for the Xbox One version. Praise was particularly directed at the game's narrative, and the actors' performance. However, the game's lack of interactivity was often criticised.

GamesRadar's David Roberts lauded the game's sound design and music, remarking that "the John Carpenter-ian strains of its synths and the quality foley work help sell some of its more distressing moments... Playing in the dark with my headphones in, this scene got under my skin in a way few games have"

Anthony John Agnello visited the game for GamesRadar and called it "PS4's freakiest post-apocalyptic game".

After naming the game as "the strangest game played at Gamescom 2016", IGN's Joe Skrebels said "it's really weird and interesting and exactly the kind of thing you come to these kind of conventions to see."

Stephen Turner of Destructoid praised the atmospheric mood of the game, "The Bunker perfectly captures John’s sense of claustrophobia and paranoia with intense close-ups, security footage, and just a really good use of lighting." However, Xbox Achievement's Richard Walker disagreed with this concluding "A linear interactive drama that fails to engender any sense of genuine drama or tension."

A mixed review by Eurogamer's Christian Donlan spoke highly of the production, stating "it affords this production the means of incorporating a real Cold War bunker which, as Martin mentioned in his preview, is the true star of the show: a place both echoey and claustrophobic, and grimly evocative of old-school Britain in its range of institutional greens and greys". However, he went on to criticise the game's limited gameplay aspects, saying "The Bunker is a fairly simple-minded game – at most you will be tasked with finding the odd key in order to proceed through the linear plot – and while it's often a memorable one, that's more down to its setting and throw-back tech than its design or its narrative."

Accolades 
The Bunker has received three award nominations at the TIGA Games Industry Awards 2016 for Most Original Game, Audio Design and Game of the Year

References

External links

2016 video games
Adventure games
Android (operating system) games
Full motion video based games
Indie video games
Interactive movie video games
IOS games
MacOS games
Nintendo Switch games
PlayStation 4 games
Single-player video games
Video games developed in the United Kingdom
Wales Interactive games
Windows games
Xbox One games